Van Roystadion is a stadium in Denderleeuw, Belgium. It is mainly used for football and is the home stadium of Dender EH.  Built in 1997, it has a capacity of 6,429. In 2008, the FCV Dender EH-management decided to build a new stadium, because the old one didn't fit to League One conditions. It was created by local architect Frank Leenknegt and was known as the Florent Beeckmanstadion until 2011 when it was renamed to its current name.

References 

Football venues in Flanders
Sports venues in East Flanders
F.C.V. Dender E.H.